Terebra jacksoniana is a species of sea snail, a marine gastropod mollusc in the family Terebridae, the auger snails.

Description

Distribution
This species is native to regions of Australia including Ballina, New South Wales and south-eastern South Australia.

References

Terebridae
Gastropods described in 1976